A tilting car is a type of automobile that has the ability to change the angle between the road and the bottom of the passenger cabin in such a way that there are reduced horizontal forces on the passengers while the vehicle is driving through a curve. It may have three or four wheels.

Examples 
 Mercedes-Benz S-Class, 2014–present
 Carver
 Lumeneo Smera
 Nissan Land Glider
  Tilter

References

Automotive terminology